There are over 9,000 Grade I listed buildings in England. This page is a list of these buildings in the district of Hambleton in North Yorkshire.

Hambleton

|}

Notes

References

External links

Hambleton
Lists of Grade I listed buildings in North Yorkshire
Hambleton District